Wakeley is a suburb of Sydney, in the state of New South Wales, Australia 34 kilometres west of the Sydney central business district in the local government area of the City of Fairfield. Wakeley is part of the Greater Western Sydney region.

The City of Fairfield Council Chambers are located in Wakeley.

History
Wakeley is named after Daniel Wakeley, an early settler in the area. It was mainly used for farming until being redeveloped as a residential suburb in 1980.

Schools
King Park Public School
 Mary MacKillop College, which is run by the Sisters of St Joseph.

Churches
A Salvation Army and charity centre are also there.

The Christ The Good Shepherd Church, located in the suburb, was opened in 2015 by its head priest Mar Mari Emmanuel, a metropolitan bishop of Australia and New Zealand.

References

Suburbs of Sydney
City of Fairfield